Travis Kerschen (born 3 November 1982, Great Yarmouth, Norfolk) is an independent film actor.

Filmography

Benoît Brisefer: Les taxis rouges (actor) 
Brèves de comptoir (actor)   
The Red Scare (actor) 
La Belle et la Bête (actor)  
Saint Laurent (actor) 
Saint Loin la mauderne (actor) 
Hippocrate (actor) 
Aimer, boire et chanter (actor)
L'écume des jours (English title: Mood Indigo) (actor)  
Untitled Harrison Atkins film (actor) 
All One Moment (actor) 
Hellstorm (actor)  
Paradox Hill (actor)  
A Time to Prey (actor) 
Rain Curtain (actor)    
A Day in the Life (actor) 
Tantrika (director)
IKO (movie)  (director)
Il Sangue dell'impero (producer)
On the Run (producer)
Best Actress (editor)
Hugo de Mexico (director)
Luz (director)
Black Dollar (director)

References

English film directors
English film editors
English film producers
English screenwriters
English male screenwriters
Living people
English male film actors
1982 births
People from Great Yarmouth
Actors from Norfolk